The NWSL Draft is an annual event which takes place in January of each year where the teams of the National Women's Soccer League (NWSL) select players who are in their senior season in college or have exhausted their collegiate eligibility. Prior to 2021, it was known as the NWSL College Draft.

The NWSL Draft was first instituted in 2013 a few months prior to the start of the inaugural season of the league. The draft is composed of four rounds in which each club has a selection, the order of which is determined by a combination of the teams' playoff and regular season positions, with the last-placed team or any expansion teams picking first.

Eligible players 
Players from the NCAA and the NAIA who have completed their senior season or who are no longer eligible to play collegiate soccer are eligible to participate in the draft. If a collegiate player is eligible but does not register for the draft, that player will not be available for selection by a team until the upcoming season is complete. In those cases, the player will become available to teams as a discovery player. Any player that registered for the draft but was not drafted becomes available to all NWSL teams as a discovery player.

Rules of draft selection 
The draft order is primarily built upon the team's final ranking during the previous season. If teams were tied, the league follows Tie Breaking procedures. Draft order may also be impacted by trades involving draft picks and expansion teams.

List of NWSL Drafts

See also 
Draft (sports)

References 

College Draft
Annual sporting events in the United States
Recurring sporting events established in 2013